Leonard Irving Cassidy (November 18, 1919 – January 30, 2007) was a Canadian football player who played for the Toronto Argonauts. He won the Grey Cup with Toronto in 1945, 1946 and 1947.

References

1919 births
Canadian football people from Toronto
Saskatchewan Roughriders players
Toronto Argonauts players
2007 deaths
Sportspeople from Kawartha Lakes
Players of Canadian football from Ontario